Aglasterhausen is a municipality in the district of Neckar-Odenwald-Kreis, in Baden-Württemberg, Germany.

History
Aglasterhausen is first mentioned in the records of the Bishop of Worms in 1143. It had its own nobility as early as the middle of the 12th century.

In 1416, the town was ceded to the Electorate of the Palatinate, but with the death of Friedrich von Hirschhorn in 1632, that line ended, and the ownership reverted to the bishopric of Worms. This continued until 1803, when Aglasterhausen was given to Baden.

Mayors 
 1981–2013: Erich Dambach
 2013–2021: Sabine Schweiger
 since 2021: Stefan Josef Kron

Personalities 
 Albert Schreiner (1892-1979), Communist politician and historian
 Helmut Degen (1911-1995), composer
 Hans Kissel (1897-1975), major-general

References
 Official Web site

Neckar-Odenwald-Kreis